PSeInt is a multiplatform educational free software, directed at people who start programming. The version for desktop operating systems interprets pseudocode in Spanish, the Android version interprets pseudocode in English, Spanish and Portuguese.

Description 
PSeInt is the abbreviation of PSeudocode Interpreter, an educational tool created in Argentina, used mainly by students to learn the basics of programming and the development of logic. It is a very popular software of its kind and is widely used in universities in Latin America and Spain.
It uses pseudocode for the solution of algorithms.

Purpose of PSeInt 
PSeInt is designed to assist students who start in the construction of computer algorithms or programs. The pseudocode is usually used as the first contact to introduce basic concepts such as the use of control structures, expressions, variables, etc., without having to deal with the particularities of the syntax of a real language. This software aims to facilitate the beginner the task of writing algorithms in this pseudolanguage by presenting a set of aids and assistance, and also provide some additional tools that help you find errors and understand the logic of the algorithms.

Characteristics 

 Autocomplete language
 Emerging aid
 Command Templates
 Supports procedures and functions
 Intelligent Indentation
 Export to other languages (C, C++, C#, Java, PHP, JavaScript, Visual Basic .NET, Python, Matlab)
 Graphing, creation and edition of flow diagrams
 Editor with syntax coloring
 PSeInt official forum
 Multi-platform software on Microsoft Windows, Linux and Mac OS X, in December 2016 started an independent development for Android.

Award 
PSeInt was the Project of the Month at SourceForge on two occasions, from September 1, 2015 and from December 19, 2016.

References

External links 
 Ejercicios en pseint resueltos
 Premiado por crear un novedoso desarrollo sobre software libre (Awarded for creating an innovative development on free software) 

Cross-platform software
Free software
Educational programming languages
Non-English-based programming languages
Programming languages created in 2003